Go Away Stowaway is a 1967 Warner Bros. Merrie Melodies cartoon directed by Alex Lovy. The short was released on September 30, 1967, and stars Daffy Duck and Speedy Gonzales.

This marks Daffy and Speedy's final appearances in the Merrie Melodies series.

Plot
Daffy, tired of Speedy's singing and antics, decides to take a vacation (prompted by Speedy making him believe it's winter) from the mouse. However, unbeknownst to him, the mouse has stowed away in his luggage.

Speedy reveals himself once they are on a cruise liner, and Daffy quickly tries to get rid of him, but is tricked into the ocean, narrowly avoiding becoming shark bait. He decides to stay in his cabin, but Speedy again tricks him and gets his lunch. Thoroughly annoyed, Daffy attempts to fool Speedy into jumping overboard by pulling the emergency whistle, but instead is himself fooled into jumping ship.

Finally, Daffy drops the anchor as Speedy runs past, missing and sinking the cruise ship. Speedy resumes singing atop Daffy's stomach, who is forced to save them both.

Notes
This cartoon makes use of some Hanna-Barbera sound effects. This was the final Warner Bros. cartoon to use the original "Abstract WB" titles that have been in regular use since 1964. Beginning with the following cartoon, Cool Cat, the title sequences are revised to feature the Warner Bros.-Seven Arts logo.

References

External links
 

Merrie Melodies short films
Warner Bros. Cartoons animated short films
Films scored by William Lava
1967 films
1967 animated films
1967 short films
Daffy Duck films
Speedy Gonzales films
Animated films about mice
Films directed by Alex Lovy
1960s Warner Bros. animated short films
1960s English-language films